Kormáks saga is one of the Icelanders' sagas. The saga was probably written during the first part of the 13th century. 

Though the saga is believed to have been among the earliest sagas composed, it is well preserved. The unknown author clearly relies on oral tradition and seems unwilling to add much of his own or even to fully integrate the different accounts he knew of Kormákr. Often, he does little more than briefly set the scenes for Kormákr's stanzas. The only complete version of the saga is found in the Icelandic manuscript 
Möðruvallabók AM 132 fol.

The saga tells of the tenth-century Icelandic poet  Kormak Ogmundsson (Kormákr Ögmundarson) and of the love of his life, Steingerd Torkelsdatter (Steingerðr Þórkelsdóttir), to whom he is betrothed. Due to a curse, he arrives too late for his wedding with Steingerðr, who  marries another. Kormak then follows King Harald Greycloak to Ireland. Later, in Scotland, he loses his life in a battle with a wizard. The saga preserves a significant number of poems attributed to Kormak, many of them dealing with his love for Steingerd.

Kormákr's love poems
The following stanzas, in which Kormak recalls the first time he met Steingerd, represent the style and content of his love poems.Read aloud.

References

Other sources
 Einar Ól. Sveinsson (Ed.) (1939). Íslenzk fornrit VIII - Vatnsdœla saga. Reykjavík: Hið íslenzka fornritafélag.
 Hollander, Lee M. (Ed.) (1949). The Sagas of Kormák and The Sworn Brothers. Princeton: Princeton University Press.
 Viðar Hreinsson (Ed.) (1997). The Complete Sagas of Icelanders, Volume 1. Reykjavík: Leifur Eiríksson Publishing. .

External links
Full text of the saga in the original language
Full text and translations at the Icelandic Saga Database
All of Kormákr's poems in Icelandic
W. G. Collingwood and Jón Stefánsson, The Life and Death of Cormac the Skald, Viking Club Translation Series, 1 ([Ulverston: Holmes, 1902]), available as a pdf at http://vsnrweb-publications.org.uk/Cormac%20the%20Skald.pdf and as text at http://www.worldwideschool.org/library/books/lit/epics/LifeandDeathofCormactheSkald/Chap1.html
Russell Poole, "Composition Transmission Performance: The First Ten lausavísur in Kormáks saga", Alvíssmál 7 (1997): 37–60.
Full text of the saga in English at The Medieval and Classical Literature Library

Sagas of Icelanders
Works of unknown authorship